The 1919 All-Pacific Coast football team consists of American football players chosen by various organizations for All-Pacific Coast teams for the 1919 college football season.

All-Pacific Coast selections

Quarterback
 Bill Steers, Oregon (PS-1)

Halfbacks
 Carlton G. Wells, California (PS-1)
 Lloyd Gillis, Washington State (PS-1)

Fullback
 Dink Templeton, Stanford (PS-1)

Ends
 Ted Faulk, Washington (PS-1)
 Hubbard, Oregon Agricultural (PS-1)

Tackles
 Walter Herreid, Washington State (PS-1)
 William Grimm, Washington (PS-1)

Guards
 Beull Blake, Washington (PS-1)
 Elwert, Washington State (PS-1)

Centers
 Earl Dunlap, Washington State (PS-1)

Key
PS = Plowden Stott, "one of the foremost Western football officials"

See also
1919 College Football All-America Team

References

All-Pacific Coast Football Team
All-Pacific Coast football teams
All-Pac-12 Conference football teams